Fuliqu railway station is a station on the Lanzhou–Zhongchuan Airport intercity railway. When the railway went into operation, only the concrete core and the platforms of the station were built. The station opened on January 8, 2020 as a commuter station served by 12 trains a day.

References

Railway stations in Gansu
Railway stations in China opened in 2020